Grape seed extract is an industrial derivative of whole grape seeds. The extract contains proanthocyanidins. Grape seed extract quality is measured by the content of procyanidins which are formed from proanthocyanidins. Generally, grape seed extract quality contains 95% procyanidins, but potency varies among products. Eating foods or beverages high in procyanidin results in the sensation of the mouth puckering and dehydration, otherwise known as astringency, as felt after certain alcoholic drinks.

Extraction method
The properties of grape seed extract depend on the extraction process used to obtain it and how the grapes were grown. The classic method incorporates extraction with organic solvents such as acetone, acetonitrile, ethyl acetate, and methanol. Other methods using hot water have been used, but they are not as effective at maximizing extract production in both quantity and efficiency. High performance liquid chromatography seems to be the most effective analysis along with proton NMR spectroscopy with principal component analysis to ensure accurate composition.

Research

A meta-analysis of 16 randomized controlled trials concluded that grape seed extract, in a dose of under 800 milligrams per day over at least 8 weeks, significantly lowered systolic and diastolic blood pressure, although the amounts were small (3–6 mmHg) and occurred only in obese people under age 50 with existing metabolic syndrome and hypertension. An earlier meta-analysis reported lower systolic blood pressure and heart rate, with no effect on blood lipids or C-reactive protein levels.

The US National Center for Complementary and Integrative Health reported that oral administration of grape seed extract (dose and frequency unreported) was well tolerated in people over 14 weeks. Side effects may include itchy scalp, dizziness, headache, high blood pressure, and nausea. Grape seed extract is sold in dietary supplement form and claimed to have numerous health benefits, none of which is supported by sufficient medical evidence.

See also 
 List of unproven and disproven cancer treatments

References 

Dietary supplements
Grape
Alternative cancer treatments